Daniela Veleska (born 10 March 1997) is a Macedonian footballer who plays as a defender for Women's Championship club Despina and the North Macedonia women's national team.

References

1997 births
Living people
Macedonian women's footballers
Women's association football defenders
North Macedonia women's international footballers